Mountain Mesa (often shortened to Mt. Mesa) is a census-designated place (CDP) in Kern County, California, United States. The population was 777 at the 2010 census, up from 716 at the 2000 census.

Geography

Demographics

2010
At the 2010 census Mountain Mesa had a population of 777. The racial makeup of Mountain Mesa was 687 (88.4%) White, 7 (0.9%) African American, 16 (2.1%) Native American, 6 (0.8%) Asian, 2 (0.3%) Pacific Islander, 27 (3.5%) from other races, and 32 (4.1%) from two or more races. Hispanic or Latino of any race were 77 people (9.9%).

The census reported that 715 people (92.0% of the population) lived in households, no one lived in non-institutionalized group quarters and 62 (8.0%) were institutionalized.

There were 304 households, 80 (26.3%) had children under the age of 18 living in them, 139 (45.7%) were opposite-sex married couples living together, 26 (8.6%) had a female householder with no husband present, 27 (8.9%) had a male householder with no wife present.  There were 18 (5.9%) unmarried opposite-sex partnerships, and 5 (1.6%) same-sex married couples or partnerships. 88 households (28.9%) were one person and 44 (14.5%) had someone living alone who was 65 or older. The average household size was 2.35.  There were 192 families (63.2% of households); the average family size was 2.88.

The age distribution was 155 people (19.9%) under the age of 18, 51 people (6.6%) aged 18 to 24, 133 people (17.1%) aged 25 to 44, 222 people (28.6%) aged 45 to 64, and 216 people (27.8%) who were 65 or older.  The median age was 49.8 years. For every 100 females, there were 101.3 males.  For every 100 females age 18 and over, there were 93.2 males.

There were 368 housing units at an average density of 442.7 per square mile, of the occupied units 235 (77.3%) were owner-occupied and 69 (22.7%) were rented. The homeowner vacancy rate was 2.9%; the rental vacancy rate was 18.6%.  520 people (66.9% of the population) lived in owner-occupied housing units and 195 people (25.1%) lived in rental housing units.

2000
At the 2000 census there were 716 people, 295 households, and 197 families living in the CDP. The racial makeup of the CDP was 95.11% White, 0.28% Black or African American, 0.28% Native American, 0.14% Pacific Islander, 0.98% from other races, and 3.21% from two or more races.  3.77% of the population were Hispanic or Latino of any race.
Of the 295 households 22.4% had children under the age of 18 living with them, 53.6% were married couples living together, 10.8% had a female householder with no husband present, and 32.9% were non-families. 30.5% of households were one person and 20.0% were one person aged 65 or older.  The average household size was 2.19 and the average family size was 2.68.

The age distribution was 17.6% under the age of 18, 4.7% from 18 to 24, 18.9% from 25 to 44, 21.8% from 45 to 64, and 37.0% 65 or older.  The median age was 52 years. For every 100 females, there were 84.5 males.  For every 100 females age 18 and over, there were 82.7 males.

The median household income was $23,875 and the median family income  was $32,656. Males had a median income of $26,161 versus $14,797 for females. The per capita income for the CDP was $13,759.  About 28.9% of families and 27.7% of the population were below the poverty line, including 59.2% of those under age 18 and 31.5% of those age 65 or over.

References

Census-designated places in Kern County, California
Populated places in the Sierra Nevada (United States)
Kern River Valley
Census-designated places in California